{{Infobox concert tour|concert_tour_name=Louder Than Concorde Tour|album=Rock of the Westies|artist=Elton John|start_date=29 April 1976|end_date=17 August 1976|number_of_legs=2|number_of_shows=30 in United Kingdom  32 in North America  62 in Total|last_tour=Rock of the Westies Tour (1975)|this_tour=Louder Than Concorde Tour (1976)|next_tour=A Single Man Tour (1979)}}

The Louder Than Concorde Tour was a concert tour by English musician and composer Elton John, in support of his 10th studio album Rock of the Westies. the tour included two legs (United Kingdom and North America) and a total of 62 shows.

Tour

Elton and his band recorded the Blue Moves'' album (and No. 1 hit single Don't Go Breaking My Heart) in Toronto in March 1976, and began touring the UK on 29 April in Leeds. This leg of the tour, which included a midnight show in Glasgow, ended on 4 June in Cardiff. On 29 June 1976 in Landover, Maryland, the eastern half of the US got the newly named "Louder Than Concorde (But Not Quite As Pretty)" tour, a testament to the onslaught Elton and his ferocious band were delivering to a country in the midst of its Bicentennial celebration.

On 4 July 1976, Elton played Schaefer Stadium near Boston. Billie Jean King sang backing vocals and Elton slipped Holiday Inn in to the 20-song set list, a unique event on this tour. Part-way through this leg of the tour, Ray Cooper fell ill and was forced to miss roughly a dozen shows. Ever the punsmith, Elton declared that the missing percussionist was "Ray Cooper-ating from surgery."

The tour concluded in mid-August with a record-breaking seven sold-out nights at Madison Square Garden. For these shows, Elton and the band shared the stage with the New York Community Choir and performed encores with Kiki Dee, Alice Cooper and the drag queen, Divine. As this week was winding down, Elton notified the band that he was taking a break from touring and the group soon disbanded.

Tour dates

Set list
 Grow Some Funk of Your Own
Goodbye Yellow Brick Road
 Island Girl
 Rocket Man
 Hercules
 Bennie and the Jets
 Funeral for a Friend/Love Lies Bleeding
 Love Song (Lesley Duncan cover)
 Lucy in the Sky with Diamonds (The Beatles cover)
 Don't Let the Sun Go Down on Me
 Empty Sky
 Someone Saved My Life Tonight
 Don't Go Breaking My Heart
 I've Got the Music in Me (Kiki Dee cover)
 Philadelphia Freedom
 We All Fall in Love Sometimes
 Curtains
 Tell Me When the Whistle Blows
Encore:
 Saturday Night's Alright for Fighting
 Your Song
 Pinball Wizard (The Who cover)

Tour band
 Elton John – lead vocals, piano
 Davey Johnstone – lead guitar, acoustic guitar, backing vocals
 Caleb Quaye – rhythm guitar, backing vocals
 Kenny Passarelli – bass guitar, backing vocals
 Roger Pope – drums
 James Newton Howard – keyboards, electric piano, synthesizer
 Ray Cooper – percussion
 Cindy Bullens – backing vocals
 Jon Joyce – backing vocals
 Ken Gold – backing vocals

References

External links

 Information Site with Tour Dates

Elton John concert tours
1976 concert tours